Guestia is a concealer moth genus in the subfamily Oecophorinae.

References

External links

Oecophorinae